The standard competition in dancesport at the 2017 World Games took place on 28 July 2017 at the Centennial Hall in Wrocław, Poland.

Competition format
A total of 24 pairs entered the competition. Best ten pairs from round one qualifies directly to the semifinal. In redance additional four pairs qualifies to the semifinal.  From semifinal the best six pairs qualifies to the final.

Results

References

External links
 Results on IWGA website

Dancesport at the 2017 World Games